The white-bellied munia (Lonchura leucogastra) is a species of estrildid finch. It is found in Malesia. Its natural habitat is subtropical/ tropical lowland moist forest habitat. The status of the species is evaluated as Least Concern.

References

BirdLife Species Factsheet

white-bellied munia
Birds of Malesia
white-bellied munia
white-bellied munia